Gonggi is a popular Korean children's game that is traditionally played using five or more small grape-sized pebbles. Nowadays, children buy colourful plastic stones instead of finding pebbles. It can be played alone or with friends. The stones are called gonggitdol. Since only a few stones and a flat surface are needed for play, the game can be played by anyone almost anywhere. An equivalent game also exists in India known as 'gutte'. In Nepal, it is known as 'gatti'. This game is also played in South India especially in Tamilnadu and Kerala. It's called "kallu"(meaning stones). same rules apply only that they play using pebbles. Also known as “5 taş” in Turkey meaning 5 stones.

The game is also called Jjagebatgi in North Gyeongsang Province, Salgu in South Gyeongsang Province, and Datjjakgeoli in South Jeolla Province.

Gameplay
The game generally begins with each player tossing the stones from the palm of their hand into the air. While airborne, the player switches their hand backside up. The gonggi stones are then caught on the back of the hand. The person with the leading amount plays first.

 Level 1: The stones are thrown on the playing surface and the player picks a stone to throw up in the air. While airborne, the player picks up one stone on the playing surface. Then, the player catches the stone. These steps are repeated until all the stones have been caught. 
 Level 2: The stones are thrown on the playing surface again. However, at this level, the player picks up the stones two at a time.
 Level 3: The stones are thrown on the playing surface. The stones are picked up once in a cluster of three, and the other in the amount of one.
 Level 4:  The player throws one stone in the air, places the others on the surface, and catches the airborne stone. Then the player tosses the same stone again, but this time, picks up the four clustered stones on the playing surface and catches the airborne stone.
 Level 5: The player tosses the stones from the palm of their hand into the air. While airborne, the player switches their hand backside up. The stones are then caught on the back of the hand. Then, the player throws the stones in the air and catches them. The number of stones caught amount to the score. There are various tricks in this phase. Some examples are "The Dragon" and "The Clap–Toss". However, such ostentations are not allowed in official game play.

Very hard various tricks in Level 5
 Dragon(In korean,Arirang)
While the stones are airborne, the player switches their hand backside up, catches several stones, switches their hand backside down, and catches the stones that are left over.
 Clap Toss
While the stones are airborne, the player claps their hand before catching the stones.

Both “dragon” and “clap-toss” gives the player twice the score; twice the number of stones.

Crisis
The game is called crisis because when a player reaches a certain score, the player has to go through crisis. In Korea, the crisis scores are usually the multiples of 5(5, 10, 15, ... ) or numbers that include 3, 6, or 9(3, 6, 9, 13, 16, 19, 23, 26, 29, 30, ….). When a player reaches a crisis score, the rules become different:

 Level 1: The stones are thrown on the playing surface by the player. However, unlike the original game, where the player can choose which stone to throw up first, in crisis, other players choose the first stone for the player. The steps that follow after are the same. While the first stone is airborne, the player picks up another stone on the playing surface. Then, the player catches the stone. These steps are repeated until all the stones get caught.
Since other players don’t want the player to earn more points, they choose the stone that is the hardest for the player to carry on. For example, in the first level, if two stones touch each other, other players make sure not to choose either one of the two stones. As a result, the player has to go through a crisis of needing to grab each stone without touching the other stone.

 Level 2&3: The stones are thrown on the playing surface again, and like level 1, other players choose the first stone to throw for the player. Other steps are the same.
 Level 4: The player covers their hand over the 5 stones and shakes it on the ground. When another player shouts, “stop!”, the player stops shaking. One of the other players picks up one stone carefully and throws it at the other 4 stones. The player picks up the stone that was thrown and continues level 4 by throwing it up in the air, grabbing the other stones, and catching the airborne stone.
Other players try to throw the stone with accuracy and strength in order to make the other 4 stones scatter. The more they scatter, the harder it is for the player to grab at 4 stones at once.

 Level 5: Before the player tosses the stones from the palm of their hand into the air, other players choose between ‘even’ and ‘odd’. The player has to catch that amount of stones on the back of the hand. For example, if other players call out ‘odd,’ the player has to catch either 1 or 3 or 5 stones. If the player fails to do that, the stones go on to the next person, and the player has to do level 5 again in the next turn.

Snail 
This game is usually introduced to children before they learn how to play gonggi. The only difference between snail and gonggi is how to grab the stone. In snail, the edge of the player’s hand has to be stuck on the ground at every step. Instead of throwing a stone up in the air, the player sweeps his hand across the ground in a large circle and grabs a certain number of stones. The number of stones the player has to grab at once is same as gonggi. Snail is an easy way to make oneself familiar with the number of stones one has to catch at each level. Game play known as level 1&2

Genius Gonggi
This game is taught to people who are adept in playing gonggi. The difference from gonggi is that the player doesn’t throw one stone in the air but all stones that are in the player’s hand. After throwing multiple stones, the player grabs other stone(s) from the ground and catches all the stones they threw. Like snail, the number of stones the player has to grab is same as gonggi. Like Dragon.

Playing calls
There are many playing calls in the Gonggi game. The standard calls have been listed here. The penalty for a "mess–up" requires that the player who has perpetrated it pass the stones  to the next player.

 A "double touch" occurs when a player physically touches the Gonggi stone(s) more than once.  
 A "mushroom" or a "diamond" occurs when a Gonggi stone is balanced on a diagonal position. In some versions, this orientation may be worth either extra points or the instant end of the player's turn.
 An "overhead" occurs when a player throws a Gonggi stone in any distance above their head.
 A "drop" occurs when a player, after catching all 5 Gonggi stones, drops a stone on to the playing surface.
 A "fixation" occurs in level 5 when a player deliberately adjusts the Gonggi stones in their hand.
 An "interception" is when another person distracts the person who is currently playing.
 A "kong" occurs when a player fails catch the stone at once and catches it by bouncing it on their hand several times accidentally.
 A "movement" occurs when a player moves their position to catch or grab another stone. It is forbidden in the official game but is usually allowed in other games.
 A "tree frog" occurs when a player, in level 3, picks up one stone first, and then pick the leftover three. (The player is supposed to pick the cluster of three first, and then the amount of one)

See also
Korean culture
Yut
Knucklebones

References

Korean games
Children's games
Articles containing video clips